Kangzhuang  is a station on Line 6 of Chongqing Rail Transit in Chongqing Municipality, China. It is located in Yubei District. It opened in 2012.

Station structure

References

Yubei District
Railway stations in Chongqing
Railway stations in China opened in 2012
Chongqing Rail Transit stations